La Quinta is a historic house in Bartlesville, Oklahoma, United States, that is listed on the National Register of Historic Places.

Description
The house was built in 1932 for oil magnate H.V. Foster (1875-1939). The Spanish Colonial Revival house is located on the campus of Oklahoma Wesleyan University. The building was listed on the National Register of Historic Places on July 15, 1982.

La Quinta was designed in 1930 by noted Kansas City architect Edward Buehler Delk. About the same time, Delk designed a house that was built near La Quinta for Paul Fridjof Dahlgren, the brother of Mrs. H.V. Foster. The Dahlgren house is Spanish Revival in style. It is located to the south of La Quinta in the Country Club Terrace subdivision.

See also

 
National Register of Historic Places listings in Washington County, Oklahoma

References

External links

Houses in Washington County, Oklahoma
Houses completed in 1932
Houses on the National Register of Historic Places in Oklahoma
Oklahoma Wesleyan University
National Register of Historic Places in Washington County, Oklahoma
Spanish Colonial Revival architecture
Bartlesville, Oklahoma